The Daejeon National Cemetery is located in Hyeonchungwon-ro, Yuseong-gu, Daejeon, South Korea. It is South Korea's second national cemetery after the Seoul National Cemetery and is overseen by the Ministry of Patriots' and Veterans' Affairs (South Korea).

The cemetery is reserved for Korean veterans, including those who died in the Korean independence movement, Korean War, Vietnam War and post Korean War clashes with North Korea.

History
As the Seoul National Cemetery was reaching capacity in the early 1970s, on 16 December 1974, then President Park Chung-hee ordered that investigations commence for the establishment of a new national cemetery site. The Daejeon site was selected on 14 April 1976. Construction of the cemetery began on 1 April 1979 and the first burial took place on 27 August 1982. The cemetery was officially inaugurated on 13 November 1985.

The cemetery covers an area of 3,300,150 m2 and facilities include a Memorial Tower and Memorial Gate, Patriotic Spirit Exhibition Center, an outdoor exhibition space, fountains, statues, sculptures, pavilions, and Hyeonchungji, a man-made pond in the shape of the Korean Peninsula.

The Daejeon National Cemetery allows access to the public.

Baseline of usage 
 The President, the President of the National Assembly
 Chief Justice of the Supreme Court or the President of the Constitutional Court
 The person who died as a patriotic branch and the patriotic line-up in accordance with Article 4 of the Act on the Honorable Treatment of independent Beneficiaries.

Notable burials
 Sohn Kee-chung (1912–2002), first Korean to win a medal at the Olympic Games
 Hwang Jang-yop (1923–2010), highest-ranking North Korean politician who defected to South Korea in 1997
 Choi Kyu-hah (1919–2006), fourth President of South Korea
Hong Gi (1916–2004), wife of former president Choi
 Lee Jong-wook (1945–2006), director-general of the World Health Organization
 Shin Hyun-joon (1915–2007), first commander of the Republic of Korea Marine Corps
 All 46 crewmembers killed in the 2010 ROKS Cheonan sinking
 Hasa (Sergeant) Seo Jeong-wu and Ilbyeong (Lance Corporal) Moon Gwang-wuk, both South Korean marines, killed in the 2010 Bombardment of Yeonpyeong
 Lho Shin-yong (1930–2019), Prime Minister of South Korea between 1985–87
 Paik Sun-yup (1920–2020), first four-star general in the history of the South Korean military

See also

 Cemetery for North Korean and Chinese Soldiers – in Paju, South Korea
 History of South Korea
 Kumsusan Palace of the Sun – in North Korea
 List of national cemeteries by country
 Patriotic Martyrs' Cemetery – in North Korea
 Revolutionary Martyrs' Cemetery – in North Korea
 Seoul National Cemetery
 United Nations Memorial Cemetery – in Busan
 War Memorial of Korea – in Seoul

References

External links
 Cemetery website
 

Buildings and structures in Daejeon
Korean War memorials and cemeteries
Cemeteries in South Korea
National cemeteries
1976 establishments in South Korea